The men's light heavyweight (81 kg/178.2 lbs) Full-Contact category at the W.A.K.O. World Championships 2007 in Coimbra was the fourth heaviest of the male Full-Contact tournaments involving seventeen fighters from three continents (Europe, Asia and North America).  Each of the matches was three rounds of two minutes each and were fought under Full-Contact rules.

As there were far too few fighters for a tournament designed for thirty-two, fourteen of the men received a bye through to the second round.  The tournament champion was Nikita Kuzmin from Russia who defeated Ehram Majidov from Azerbaijan by unanimous decision in the final to win gold.  Defeated semi finalists Dénes Rácz from Hungary and Micky Marshall from Canada won bronze medals.

Results

Key

See also
List of WAKO Amateur World Championships
List of WAKO Amateur European Championships
List of male kickboxers

References

External links
 WAKO World Association of Kickboxing Organizations Official Site

Kickboxing events at the WAKO World Championships 2007 Coimbra
2007 in kickboxing
Kickboxing in Portugal